In railroading, a slug is a version of a diesel-electric locomotive which lacks a prime mover, and often a cab.  It derives the electrical power needed to operate its traction motors and motor controls from a fully-powered mother locomotive.  When coupled together it  takes advantage of the excess current that the mother's diesel-electric locomotive produces at low speed, providing additional horsepower and braking at such operation without the expense of a full locomotive.

A slug is distinct from a B–unit, which has both a prime mover and traction motors but no cab. A slug may retain an operator's cab to allow engineers to operate a train with the slug in the lead, or may have the cab and much of the body removed to save space and allow the operator in the mother better rear visibility.

Basic principles
A slug is used to increase adhesive weight, allowing full power to be applied at a lower speed, thus allowing a higher maximum tractive effort. They are often used in low-speed operations such as switching operations in yards. At low speeds, a diesel-electric locomotive prime mover is capable of producing more electricity than its traction motors can use effectively. Extra power would cause the wheels to slip and possibly overheat the traction motors. A slug increases the number of traction motors available to the locomotive, increasing both the pulling and braking force. In addition the load on each traction motor is reduced, which helps prevent overheating from excess current. Lacking a prime mover, slugs typically carry ballast to increase their weight and improve traction, often in the form of large blocks of concrete.

Slugs can be built new or converted from existing locomotives. Conversion has enjoyed popularity as a way to reuse otherwise obsolete locomotives, especially those with worn-out diesel prime movers but having good traction motors.

Types
There are several types of slug, distinguished by intended use. This division is not absolute, and characteristics of one type may appear on another.

Yard slugs

A yard slug is designed for switching, and therefore is built to increase visibility in low-speed operation. It has a low body and no cab, allowing the engineer or driver in the powered unit to see past it. Mother-slug sets are used in heavy switching, hump yard switching, and transfer runs between yards. Some are radio controlled without an engineer in the cab.

Hump slugs
A hump slug is designed for even slower operation than a yard slug. They are often six-axle slugs and are often paired with lower-powered six-axle locomotives.

Road slugs

Road slugs are intended to serve as part of a regular locomotive consist for road haulage, and as a result have certain adaptations to suit them for this service. They usually retain dynamic brakes, a feature useless at the low speeds encountered in switching service, and they may be equipped to serve as fuel tenders for the attached "mother" locomotives.

In operation, they are used to provide extra traction at low speeds. As speed increases they are disconnected from the power circuit and function as a control cab if they are in the lead, or simply as an unpowered car in the consist. In braking they augment the powered locomotives, both during dynamic and air brake application.

Road slugs may take several forms. A group of GP30, GP35, GP38, GP38AC, and GP40 locomotives were converted by CSX and operated as half of mother-slug pairs. Externally they retain the general appearance of powered diesel-electric locomotives, though they can be identified by the lack of radiators and the removal of most of the access doors on the side of the body. They retain the cab and its controls, and therefore multiple unit control allows them to function as the lead in a string of units. The TEBU units created on the Southern Pacific Railroad from General Electric U25Bs, on the other hand, were cabless; this potential operational deficiency was compensated for by putting them as the center unit of a set of three.

When at one end of a set, train crews will often go to great lengths to arrange for the slug to be the leading unit, as the lack of a diesel prime mover provides them with a quiet and vibration-free ride.

Motors for added tractive effort
Motors for added tractive effort, or MATEs, appear similar to slugs, but their design is different. Instead of siphoning off power as a slug does, the axles in a MATE are fully connected into the transition series in the locomotive it is connected to. A double-ended MATE (a MATE with connections on both ends) turns two four-axle locomotives into the equivalent of two fully fledged six-axle locomotives. A single-ended MATE turns a four-axle locomotive into the equivalent of an eight-axle locomotive. MATEs do not cut out at speed, as the motors are fully included in the series–parallel transition stages. Seaboard Coast Line Railroad's GE U36B fleet is the prime example: they were delivered new with special electrical cabinets to handle the two-to-four extra motors in a MATE. With a double-ended MATE, two U36Bs were equivalent to two U36Cs in every way.

Some railroads emulated this concept by using two GP40s, then swapping in six-axle Dash 2 electrical cabinets, and then connecting the GP40s to a double-ended slug rebuilt from an old locomotive. The result is the equivalent of two SD40-2s.

Terminology

Slugs are known by other names as well. Some are:
Drone (used by the Santa Fe)
MATE (motors for added tractive effort, used by GE)
RDMT (road MATE), used by CSX
RDMATE (used by EMD)
TEBU (tractive effort booster unit, used by Morrison-Knudsen and Southern Pacific)
TEBC (tractive effort booster cab, BN/BNSF cabbed slugs)
TEBCU (tractive effort booster cab unit, BN/BNSF cabbed slugs)
Hump booster, used by Canadian National

The CCRCLs (control car remote control locomotives) used by Union Pacific are sometimes called slugs. This designation is incorrect as the CCRCLs do not have traction motors.

Snails
A snail, often confused with a slug, is a cabless locomotive with a prime mover. However, instead of getting electricity from a separate unit, snails have no traction motors and therefore are incapable of operating under their own power. Like slugs, snails are rebuilt from damaged or worn out locomotives and retain the frame and bogies from the original unit. Snails are used for powering engineless units and have no cab or means to control themselves manually, except from a separate unit. SP rebuilt 9 F7Bs into snails for their rotary snowplows. Some of these are still in use today with Union Pacific, along with their snowplow parent units, fighting snow on Donner Pass.

See also
 Cow-calf
 Brake tender

References

External links

 'Slugs' for extra tractive effort - Trains Magazine
 Difference between a cabless booster, a slug, and a calf - Trains Magazine

Diesel locomotives